The XII Venice Challenge Save Cup was a professional tennis tournament played on clay courts. It was the 1st edition of the men's tournament which was part of the 2014 ATP Challenger Tour. It took place in Mestre, Italy between 2 and 8 June 2014.

Singles main-draw entrants

Seeds

 1 Rankings are as of May 26, 2014.

Other entrants
The following players received wildcards into the singles main draw:
  Marco Cecchinato
  Salvatore Caruso
  Stefano Travaglia
  Horacio Zeballos

The following players received entry from the qualifying draw:
  Janez Semrajc
  Alessandro Giannessi
  Roberto Marcora
  Marco Trungelliti

Doubles main-draw entrants

Seeds

1 Rankings as of May 26, 2014.

Other entrants
The following pairs received wildcards into the doubles main draw:
  Andrea Basso /  Gianluca Mager
  Andrej Kračman /  Mario Radić
  Daniele Giorgini /  Matteo Volante

Champions

Singles

 Pablo Cuevas def.  Marco Cecchinato, 6–4, 4–6, 6–2

Doubles

 Pablo Cuevas /  Horacio Zeballos def.  Daniele Bracciali /  Potito Starace, 6–4, 6–1

External links
 Official website

Venice Challenge Save Cup
Venice Challenge Save Cup
June 2014 sports events in Italy